Lower Parel (Pronunciation: [pəɾəɭ], [pəɾeːl]; station code: PL) railway station is a railway station on the Western Line of the Mumbai Suburban Railway, India. The next station south is Mahalaxmi railway station; the next station north is Prabhadevi.

Lower Parel railway station has three platforms. From platform no.1, slow local trains go towards Dadar-Bandra-Andheri-Borivali -Virar, from platform no.2, slow local trains go towards Mumbai Central-Churchgate, and Platform No.3 is kept as a reserve that can be used in emergency and during mega-block on Sundays.

As Lower Parel has become a corporate hub, thousands of people use the railway station daily, which makes the Lower Parel railway station one of the most crowded local railway stations of Mumbai.

It will have a connection to phase II of the Mumbai Monorail, due to open in 2015.

The Delisle Bridge, which connects to Lower Parel, was shut to traffic in 2018 and is expected to reopen in 2023 after pandemic-caused delays.

See also
Carriage Repair Workshop, Lower Parel, Mumbai

Notes and references

Railway stations opened in 1867
Mumbai WR railway division
Railway stations in Mumbai City district
Mumbai Suburban Railway stations